Love, Whitney is a compilation album by Whitney Houston, released in 2001. It was the follow-up to Houston's multi-platinum greatest hits collection Whitney: The Greatest Hits (2000). Love, Whitney is a collection of ballads that have become her trademark over the years and includes a collection of nine top 20 hits. As AllMusic reviewer Jose F. Promis noted, it "isn't meant to be a greatest-hits collection" but "it's an assortment of big, swooping Whitney Houston love songs" and that it "is solely intended for the most casual of fans".

Track listing

Charts

Weekly charts

Monthly charts

Certifications and sales

References

External links 
 
 Love, Whitney at Discogs

2001 compilation albums
Whitney Houston compilation albums